Communication Linking Protocol (CLP) is a communications protocol used to communicate with many devices using the Motorola ReFLEX network.  CLP allows a user to direct a ReFlex capable device to send or receive messages.  CLP is used by Advantra's ReFLEX devices.  Advantra's ReFLEX product line was purchased by Inilex who now manufactures the devices.

External links
 ReFLEX White Paper
 Two Way Paging Article
 Artic
 Barran Device
 Karli Device
 Wirlki Device

Radio paging
Wireless networking